Dorton Halt railway station was a railway station serving the village of Dorton in Buckinghamshire. It was on what is now known as the Chiltern Main Line. The station was geographically nearer to Brill than Brill and Ludgershall railway station.

History 

Dorton Halt was opened on 21 July 1937, being situated between Brill & Ludgershall and Haddenham on the Great Western Railway's Bicester cut-off line, which had opened in 1910. It was built to serve the villages of Dorton, Wotton, Chilton and Ashendon, which lay in an agricultural district, and together had a population of 650. There were two platforms, each with a shelter; the station was electrically lit. The line became part of the Western Region of British Railways on nationalisation in 1948. British Railways closed the station on 7 January 1963.

Notes

References

External links 
 The station on navigable 1946 O. S. map

Disused railway stations in Buckinghamshire
Former Great Western Railway stations
Railway stations in Great Britain opened in 1937
Railway stations in Great Britain closed in 1963
1937 establishments in England
1963 disestablishments in England